Ogna is a village in Hå municipality in Rogaland county, Norway.  The village is located immediately north of the village of Sirevåg on the shores of the Ognaelva river.  The village was the administrative centre of the historic municipality of Ogna.  The village is the site of Ogna Station, a railway station along the Sørlandet Line.

Ogna is the site of the centuries-old Ogna Church.  The little church, which dates back to the Middle Ages, was restored and added to after a fire in 1991. It is often open in the summer for visitors. Ogna also has beautiful sand beaches, and salmon fishing is very popular in the nearby river. Norwegian County Road 44, which also forms the tourist route known as the North Sea Road, passes through the village.

References

Villages in Rogaland
Hå